The Enabling Act of 1933, officially titled , was a law that gave the German Cabinet – most importantly, the Chancellor – the powers to make and enforce laws without the involvement of the Reichstag or Weimar President Paul von Hindenburg, leading to the rise of Nazi Germany. Critically, the Enabling Act allowed the Chancellor to bypass the system of checks and balances in the government.

In January 1933,  Adolf Hitler, leader of the Nazi Party, was appointed as chancellor, the head of the German government. On February 27, the German parliament building — the Reichstag — caught fire. Acting as chancellor, Hitler immediately accused the communists of being the perpetrators of the fire and claimed the arson was part of a larger effort to overthrow the German government. Using this justification, Hitler persuaded Hindenburg to enact the Reichstag Fire Decree. The decree abolished most civil liberties, including the right to speak, assemble, protest, and due process. Using the decree, the Nazis declared a state of emergency and began a violent crackdown against their political enemies.  As Hitler cleared the political arena of anyone willing to challenge him, he contended that the decree was insufficient and required sweeping policies that would safeguard his emerging dictatorship. Hitler submitted a proposal to the Reichstag that if passed would immediately grant all legislative powers to the cabinet and by extension Hitler. This would in effect allow Hitler's government to act without concern to the constitution.

Despite outlawing the communists and repressing other opponents, the passage of the Enabling Act was not a guarantee. Hitler allied with other nationalist and conservative factions and they steamrolled over the Social Democrats in the 5 March 1933 German federal election. Germans voted in an atmosphere of extreme voter intimidation perpetrated by the Nazi Sturmabteilung (SA) militia. Contrary to popular belief, Hitler did not win an outright majority in the Reichstag as the majority of Germans did not vote for the Nazi Party. The election was a setback for the Nazis; however, it was insufficient in stopping the ratification of the Enabling Act. In order to guarantee its passage, the Nazis implemented a strategy of coercion, bribery, and manipulation. Hitler removed any remaining political obstacles so his coalition of conservatives, nationalists, and Nazis could begin building the Nazi dictatorship.  By mid-March, the government began sending communists, labor union leaders, and other political dissidents to Dachau, the first Nazi concentration camp.

Once the Enabling Act was introduced, it was hastily passed by the Reichstag and Reichsrat on 23 March 1933. Later that day, the Enabling Act was signed into law by President Paul von Hindenburg. Unless extended by the Reichstag, the act would expire after four years. With the Enabling Act now in force, the cabinet (in practice, the chancellor) could pass and enforce laws without any objection. The combined effect of the Enabling Act and the Reichstag Fire Decree transformed Hitler's government into a legal dictatorship and laid the groundwork for his totalitarian regime. By July, the Nazis were the only legally permitted party in Germany. The Reichstag from 1933 onward effectively became the rubber stamp parliament that Hitler always wanted. The Enabling Act would be renewed twice and would be rendered null when Nazi Germany surrendered to the Allies in 1945.

The passing of the Enabling Act is significant in German and world history as it marked the formal transition from the democratic Weimar Republic to the totalitarian Nazi dictatorship. From 1933 onwards Hitler continued to consolidate and centralize power via purges, and propaganda. In 1934, Hitler and Heinrich Himmler began removing non-Nazi officials together with Hitler's rivals within the Nazi Party, culminating in the Night of the Long Knives. Once the purges of the Nazi Party and German government concluded, Hitler had total control over Germany. Armed with the Enabling Act, Hitler could begin German rearmament and achieve his aggressive foreign policy aims which ultimately resulted in the Second World War.

Background
After being appointed Chancellor of Germany on 30 January 1933, Hitler asked President von Hindenburg to dissolve the Reichstag. A general election was scheduled for 5 March 1933. A secret meeting was held between Hitler and 20 to 25 industrialists at the official residence of Hermann Göring in the Reichstag Presidential Palace, aimed at financing the election campaign of the Nazi Party.

The burning of the Reichstag was depicted by the Nazis as the beginning of a communist revolution, and Hitler urged Hindenburg to pass the presidential Reichstag Fire Decree. The decree significantly curbed civil rights for German citizens and suspended freedom of press and habeas corpus rights just five days before the election. Hitler used the decree to have the Communist Party's offices raided and its representatives arrested, effectively eliminating them as a political force.

Although they received five million more votes than in the previous election, the Nazis failed to gain an absolute majority in parliament, and depended on the 8% of seats won by their coalition partner, the German National People's Party, to reach 52% in total.

To free himself from this dependency, Hitler had the cabinet, in its first post-election meeting on 15 March, draw up plans for an Enabling Act which would give the cabinet legislative power for four years. The Nazis devised the Enabling Act to gain complete political power without the need of the support of a majority in the Reichstag and without the need to bargain with their coalition partners. The Nazi regime was unique compared to its contemporaries, most famously Joseph Stalin's, because Hitler did not seek to draft a completely new constitution whereas Stalin did so. Technically the Weimar Constitution of 1919 remained in effect even after the Enabling Act, only losing force in 1945 when Germany surrendered at the end of World War II and ceased to be a sovereign state.

Preparations and negotiations
The Enabling Act allowed the National Ministry (essentially the cabinet) to enact legislation, including laws deviating from or altering the constitution, without the consent of the Reichstag. Because this law allowed for departures from the constitution, it was itself considered a constitutional amendment. Thus, its passage required the support of two-thirds of those deputies who were present and voting. A quorum of two-thirds of the entire Reichstag was required to be present in order to call up the bill.

The Social Democrats (SPD) and the Communists (KPD) were expected to vote against the Act. The government had already arrested all Communist and some Social Democrat deputies under the Reichstag Fire Decree. The Nazis expected the parties representing the middle class, the Junkers and business interests to vote for the measure, as they had grown weary of the instability of the Weimar Republic and would not dare to resist.

Hitler believed that with the Centre Party members' votes, he would get the necessary two-thirds majority. Hitler negotiated with the Centre Party's chairman, Ludwig Kaas, a Catholic priest, finalizing an agreement by 22 March. Kaas agreed to support the Act in exchange for assurances of the Centre Party's continued existence, the protection of Catholics' civil and religious liberties, religious schools and the retention of civil servants affiliated with the Centre Party. It has also been suggested that some members of the SPD were intimidated by the presence of the Nazi Sturmabteilung (SA) throughout the proceedings.

Some historians, such as Klaus Scholder, have maintained that Hitler also promised to negotiate a Reichskonkordat with the Holy See, a treaty that formalized the position of the Catholic Church in Germany on a national level. Kaas was a close associate of Cardinal Pacelli, then Vatican Secretary of State (and later Pope Pius XII). Pacelli had been pursuing a German concordat as a key policy for some years, but the instability of Weimar governments as well as the enmity of some parties to such a treaty had blocked the project. The day after the Enabling Act vote, Kaas went to Rome in order to, in his own words, "investigate the possibilities for a comprehensive understanding between church and state". However, so far no evidence for a link between the Enabling Act and the Reichskonkordat signed on 20 July 1933 has surfaced.

Text
As with most of the laws passed in the process of Gleichschaltung, the Enabling Act is quite short, especially considering its implications. The full text, in German and English, follows:

Articles 1 and 4 gave the government the right to draw up the budget, approve treaties, and enact any laws whatsoever without input from the Reichstag. By the rules of pre-1933 (and post-1945, if such a law were not now unconstitutional) German legal interpretation, this means that such laws are put to vote in the Cabinet and there decided by majority vote (which was not followed). - Note the position of the Chancellor in Article 3. In the years immediately preceding, goverment had relied on Article 48 emergency decrees; those had to be decided by the President; also, all laws issued in the regular manner were, not decided, but still enacted by the President. In the passing of Enabling-Act-based laws however, the President had no rôle to play at all. (Thus creating, until Hitler effectively became President in 1934, the unique situation in German and possibly world history that laws were passed entirely without any contribution by the Head of State.)

Passage

Debate within the Centre Party continued until the day of the vote, 23 March 1933, with Kaas advocating voting in favour of the act, referring to an upcoming written guarantee from Hitler, while former Chancellor Heinrich Brüning called for a rejection of the Act. The majority sided with Kaas, and Brüning agreed to maintain party discipline by voting for the Act.

The Reichstag, led by its president, Hermann Göring, changed its rules of procedure to make it easier to pass the bill.  Under the Weimar Constitution, a quorum of two-thirds of the entire Reichstag membership was required to be present in order to bring up a constitutional amendment bill.  In this case, 432 of the Reichstag's 647 deputies would have normally been required for a quorum.  However, Göring reduced the quorum to 378 by not counting the 81 KPD deputies.  Despite the virulent rhetoric directed against the Communists, the Nazis did not formally ban the KPD right away.  Not only did they fear a violent uprising, but they hoped the KPD's presence on the ballot would siphon off votes from the SPD.  However, it was an open secret that the KPD deputies would never be allowed to take their seats; they were thrown in jail as quickly as the police could track them down.  Courts began taking the line that since the Communists were responsible for the fire, KPD membership was an act of treason.  Thus, for all intents and purposes, the KPD was banned as of 6 March, the day after the election.

Göring also declared that any deputy who was "absent without excuse" was to be considered as present, in order to overcome obstructions. Leaving nothing to chance, the Nazis used the provisions of the Reichstag Fire Decree to detain several SPD deputies. A few others saw the writing on the wall and fled into exile.

Later that day, the Reichstag assembled under intimidating circumstances, with SA men swarming inside and outside the chamber. Hitler's speech, which emphasised the importance of Christianity in German culture, was aimed particularly at appeasing the Centre Party's sensibilities and incorporated Kaas' requested guarantees almost verbatim. Kaas gave a speech, voicing his party's support for the bill amid "concerns put aside", while Brüning notably remained silent.

Only SPD chairman Otto Wels spoke against the Act, declaring that the proposed bill could not "destroy ideas which are eternal and indestructible." Kaas had still not received the written constitutional guarantees he had negotiated, but with the assurance it was being "typed up", voting began. Kaas never received the letter.

At this stage, the majority of deputies already supported the bill, and any deputies who might have been reluctant to vote in favour were intimidated by the SA troops surrounding the meeting. In the end, all parties except the SPD voted in favour of the Enabling Act. With the KPD banned and 26 SPD deputies arrested or in hiding, the final tally was 444 in favour of the Enabling Act against 94 (all Social Democrats) opposed. The Reichstag had adopted the Enabling Act with the support of 83% of the deputies. The session took place under such intimidating conditions that even if all SPD deputies had been present, it would have still passed with 78.7% support. The same day in the evening, the Reichsrat also gave its approval, unanimously and without prior discussion. The Act was then signed into law by President Hindenburg, Hitler as Chancellor, Wilhelm Frick as Interior Minister, Konstantin von Neurath as Foreign Minister, and Lutz Graf Schwerin von Krosigk as Finance Minister.

Voting on the Enabling Act

Consequences

Under the Act, the government had acquired the authority to enact laws without either parliamentary consent or control. These laws could (with certain exceptions) even deviate from the Constitution. The Act effectively eliminated the Reichstag as active player in German politics.  While its existence was protected by the Enabling Act, for all intents and purposes it reduced the Reichstag to a mere stage for Hitler's speeches. It only met sporadically until the end of World War II, held no debates and enacted only a few laws. Within three months of the passage of the Enabling Act, all parties except the Nazi Party were banned or pressured into dissolving themselves, followed on 14 July by a law that made the Nazi Party the only legally permitted party in the country. With this, Hitler had fulfilled what he had promised in earlier campaign speeches: "I set for myself one aim ... to sweep these thirty parties out of Germany!"

During the negotiations between the government and the political parties, it was agreed that the government should inform the Reichstag parties of legislative measures passed under the Enabling Act. For this purpose, a working committee was set up, co-chaired by Hitler and Centre Party chairman Kaas. However, this committee met only three times without any major impact, and rapidly became a dead letter even before all other parties were banned.

Though the Act had formally given legislative powers to the government as a whole, these powers were for all intents and purposes exercised by Hitler himself. After its passage, there were no longer serious deliberations in Cabinet meetings. Its meetings became more and more infrequent after 1934, and it never met in full after 1938.

Due to the great care that Hitler took to give his dictatorship an appearance of legality, the Enabling Act was renewed twice, in 1937 and 1941. However, its renewal was practically assured since all other parties were banned. Voters were presented with a single list of Nazis and Nazi-approved "guest" candidates under far-from-secret conditions. In 1942, the Reichstag passed a law giving Hitler power of life and death over every citizen, effectively extending the provisions of the Enabling Act for the duration of the war.

Ironically, at least two, and possibly three, of the penultimate measures Hitler took to consolidate his power in 1934 violated the Enabling Act. On 14 February 1934, the Reichsrat, representing the states, was abolished even though Article 2 of the Enabling Act specifically protected the existence of both the Reichstag and the Reichsrat.  It also can be argued that the Enabling Act had been breached two weeks earlier by the "Law on the Reconstruction of the Reich" (30 January 1934), which dissolved the state parliaments, transferred the states' sovereign powers to the Reich and effectively rendered the Reichsrat irrelevant. Article 2 stated that laws passed under the Enabling Act could not affect the institutions of either chamber.

In August, Hindenburg died, and Hitler seized the president's powers for himself in accordance with a law passed the previous day, an action confirmed via a referendum later that month. Article 2 stated that the president's powers were to remain "undisturbed" (or "unaffected", depending on the translation), which has long been interpreted to mean that it forbade Hitler from tampering with the presidency. A 1932 amendment to the constitution made the president of the High Court of Justice, not the chancellor, first in the line of succession to the presidency—and even then on an interim basis pending new elections.  However, the Enabling Act provided no remedy for any violations of Article 2, and these actions were never challenged in court.

The Enabling Act was formally declared to be repealed by the Allied Control Council in Control Council Law No. 1, following the Surrender of Germany in World War II.

In the Federal Republic of Germany 
Article 9 of the German Constitution, enacted in 1949, allows for social groups to be labeled  ("hostile to the constitution") and to be proscribed by the federal government. The idea behind the concept is the notion that even a majority rule of the people cannot be allowed to install a totalitarian or autocratic regime such as with the Enabling Act of 1933, thereby violating the principles of the German constitution.

Validity

In his book, The Coming of the Third Reich, British historian Richard J. Evans argued that the Enabling Act was legally invalid. He contended that Göring had no right to arbitrarily reduce the quorum required to bring the bill up for a vote. While the Enabling Act only required the support of two-thirds of those present and voting, two-thirds of the entire Reichstag's membership had to be present in order for the legislature to consider a constitutional amendment. According to Evans, while Göring was not required to count the KPD deputies in order to get the Enabling Act passed, he was required to "recognize their existence" by counting them for purposes of the quorum needed to call it up, making his refusal to do so "an illegal act". (Even if the Communists had been present and voting, the session's atmosphere was so intimidating that the Act would have still passed with, at the very least, 68.7% support.)  He also argued that the act's passage in the Reichsrat was tainted by the overthrow of the state governments under the Reichstag Fire Decree; as Evans put it, the states were no longer "properly constituted or represented", making the Enabling Act's passage in the Reichsrat "irregular".

Portrayal in films 
The 2003 film Hitler: The Rise of Evil contains a scene portraying the passage of the Enabling Act. The portrayal in this film is inaccurate, with the provisions of the Reichstag Fire Decree (which in practice, as the name states, was a decree issued by President Hindenburg weeks before the Enabling Act) merged into the Act. Non-Nazi members of the Reichstag, including Vice-Chancellor von Papen, are shown objecting. In reality the Act met little resistance, with only the centre-left Social Democratic Party voting against passage. The film also shows Hermann Göring, speaker of the house, beginning to sing the "Deutschlandlied". Nazi representatives then stand and immediately join in with Göring, as well as all other party members, with everyone performing the Hitler salute. In reality, this never happened.

See also 
 Streitbare Demokratie

References

1933 in Germany
1933 in law
1933 in politics
Constitutional amendments
Emergency laws in Germany
Government of Nazi Germany
Law in Nazi Germany
Legal history of Germany
Repealed German legislation
March 1933 events
Political repression in Nazi Germany